Talkin' Some Sense, is an album by blues musician Lightnin' Hopkins recorded in Texas in 1968 and released on Stan Lewis' Jewel Records label.

Track listing
All compositions by Sam "Lightnin'" Hopkins
 "Long Way from Home" – 2:53
 "I'm Tired of Trouble" – 3:44
 "Vietnam War Pt. 1 & 2" – 4:18
 "Lightnin' Strikes One More Time" – 2:55
 "Walkin' Blues" – 3:19
 "Talkin' Some Sense" – 2:50
 "Lonesome Lightnin'" – 3:33
 "My Suggestion" – 5:02
 "Uncle Stan, the Hip Hit Record Man" – 2:45
 "You're Gonna Miss Me" – 4:01	
 "The Purple Puppy" – 3:32

Personnel

Performance
Lightnin' Hopkins – guitar, vocals
Billy Bizor – harmonica
Elmore Nixon – piano
Lawrence Evans – bass
Unidentified musician – drums

References

Lightnin' Hopkins albums
1968 albums
Jewel Records (Shreveport record label) albums